Hindu Tamil Thisai  (colloquially known as The Hindu Tamil) is a Tamil daily newspaper headquartered at Chennai. It is published by The Hindu Group. The first issue was published on 16 September 2013. It is printed in seven centres including Chennai. The printing centres are at Chennai, Coimbatore, Madurai, Tiruchirappalli, Thiruvananthapuram, Bengaluru and Tirupathi. The Tamil newspaper covers news related to business, education, knowledge, sports, quiz and entertainment. The daily has extensive regional, national and international news coverage.

References

External links 
 Hindu Tamil website
 The Hindu pdf 

Mass media in Chennai
Mass media in Madurai
Tamil-language newspapers published in India
The Hindu Group
2013 establishments in Tamil Nadu
Newspapers established in 2013